An augmentative (abbreviated ) is a morphological form of a word which expresses greater intensity, often in size but also in other attributes. It is the opposite of a diminutive.

Overaugmenting something often makes it grotesque and so in some languages, augmentatives are used primarily for comical effect or as pejoratives.

Many languages have augmentatives for nouns, and some have augmentatives for verbs.

Germanic languages

English 
In modern English, augmentatives can be created with the prefixes:
over-: e.g., overlord and overqualified.
grand-: e.g., grandmaster and grandparent.
super-: e.g., supermarket and superpower.
mega-: e.g., megastore and megastar.
arch-: e.g., archrival and archangel.

Since the early 1990s, the prefix über- or uber- has also frequently been used as a borrowing from German. The suffix -zilla, expressing a monstrous quality, can also be considered an augmentative form.

In some parts of the United Kingdom and the Republic of Ireland, the prefix "auld" is used as an augmentative, and a pejorative in some cases. An example of this is using "auld'un" or "auld one" to describe one's parents/grandparents.

Dutch 
In modern Dutch, as in English, augmentatives are usually created with the prefixes:

There are also prefixes that can be used for some adjectives:
"stone rich" and "stone good")
"boulder hard" and "boulder fun")

German 
In German, there are different ways to build augmentatives. They are rarely used prefixes:
un-, for instance in Unzahl "huge number", Unsumme "huge sum", Unmenge "huge quantity". Mostly used for negation, however (e.g. Unglück "bad luck", Unsinn "nonsense"), and occasionally in a pejorative sense (Unwetter "bad weather", Untier "monster", lit. "un-creature").
 ur-, for instance, uralt "ancient"
 über-, for instance, Übermensch (q.v.)
 aber-, for instance, abertausend "thousands".
 mega-, for example megageil "mega-cool"
 ultra-, for example ultracool
 voll-, for example Vollidiot "utter idiot"

Swedish 
In Swedish the way to build augmentative is to add one of many prefixes before the word. This can be done on words in most word classes. The most common prefixes are: jätte- "giant", super-, 'bauta-, mega-. For example:mega "gigantic" → megahus "gigantic house"snabb "fast" → jättesnabb "very fast"sten "rock" → bautasten "boulder"

There are many synonyms to jätte-, although only when jätte- means "very", not big. Some of these synonyms are: as-, gör-, svin-, skit-, and ur- although, as written above, these do not change the size of a noun, only the intensity, e.g. gul "yellow" to jättegul "very yellow". The use of prefixes to build augmentatives is quite colloquial and is seldom used in formal text and speech, where adjectives and adverbs are used instead.

 Greek language 
In Modern Greek the usage of augmentative is very common in everyday speech but not quite as common as diminutive forms. The usage of Augmentative is considered colloquial and it is not present at all in formal speech. There are a variety of augmentative suffixes

 Fem. -α, -άρα, -άκλα
 Masc. -αράς, ΄-αρος,-ακλάς, -ακλας

Most nouns in their augmentative form are feminine. This means neuter and masculine nouns become feminine and then an augmentative suffix is added.

In some neuter cases just changing the original gender of the noun is enough for augmentation to take place

 Romance languages 

 Italian 

Italian has several augmentatives:

 -one, -ona, found also in several English loanwords from Italian, often via French: minestrone (< minestra 'soup'); provolone cheese (< provola 'a kind of cheese'); cartone (< carta 'paper') appears in English carton and cartoon; balloon (this may have been formed in Italian, though the usual form is pallone, or in French)); milione 'million' (< mille 'thousand');
Suffixes -accio, -accia, and -astro, -astra, also exist, but they are used to form pejorative words, with no properly augmentative meaning: coltellaccio (< coltello 'knife'; gives English cutlass); the family name Carpaccio.

 Portuguese 
In Portuguese, the most common augmentatives are the masculine -ão (sometimes also -zão or -zarrão) and the feminine -ona (or -zona), although there are others, less frequently used. E.g. carro "car", carrão "big car"; homem "man", homenzarrão "big man"; mulher "woman", mulherona "big woman".

Sometimes, especially in Brazilian Portuguese, the masculine augmentative can be applied to a feminine noun, which then becomes grammatically masculine, but with a feminine meaning (e.g. "o mulherão" instead of "a mulherona" for "the big woman"); however, such cases usually imply subtle meaning twists, mostly with a somewhat gross or vulgar undertone (which, nonetheless, is often intentional, for the sake of wit, malice or otherwise; so, mulherão actually means not a big woman, but a particularly sexy one).

 Romanian 
In Romanian there are several augmentative suffixes: -oi/-oaie, -an/-ană etc. (masculine/feminine pairs). They originate from Latin -ō (acc. sg. -ōnem), the origin of the other Romance augmentative suffixes. The archaic form has survived unchanged in Banat (and in Aromanian) as -on, -oan'e. As in other Romance languages, a feminine base word may have masculine or feminine forms in the augmentative. Examples:
 casă (f.) → căsoi (n.), căsoaie (f.)
 piatră (f.) → pietroi (n.)
 băiat (m.) → băiețoi (m.)
 băiat (m.) → băietan (m.)
 fată (f.) → fetișcană (f.)

 Spanish 
In Spanish, -o becomes -ón and -a becomes -ona most frequently, but -ote/-ota and -azo/-aza (also meaning -blow) are also commonly seen.  Others include  -udo/-uda, -aco/-aca, -acho/-acha, -uco/-uca, -ucho/-ucha, -astro/-astra and -ejo/-eja. More detail at Spanish nouns.

Slavic languages

Bulgarian
In Bulgarian, as in Russian, mainly with -ище.

Polish
In Polish there is a variety of augmentatives formed with suffixes, for example: żaba (a frog) → żabucha / żabsko / żabisko / żabula; or kamień (a stone) → kamulec / kamior / etc.
 -ica, e.g. igła, f. ("needle") + ica → iglica ("spire")
 -yca, e.g. wieża, f. ("tower") + yca → wieżyca
 -ch, e.g. Stanisław, m. ("Stan") + ch → Stach (short form of the name, but not diminutive)
 -chu e.g. Krzysztof, m ("Christopher") + chu → Krzychu ("Chris")
 -cha, e.g. kiełbasa f. ("sausage") + cha → kiełbacha ("large sausage")
 -ucha, e.g. dziewa, f. archaic ("girl") + ucha → dziewucha ("wench")
 -oja, e.g. dziewa, f. archaic ("girl") + oja → dziewoja ("wench")
 -uch, e.g. uparty, adj. m. ("stubborn") + uch → uparciuch
 -ocha, e.g. śpi, v. ("sleeps") + och → śpioch ("sleepyhead")
 -och, e.g.  tłusty, adj. m. ("fat") + och → tłuścioch ("fatso", "fatty")
 -al, e.g. nos, m. ("nose") + al → nochal ("large nose")
 -ula, e.g. smark, adj m. ("snot") + ula → smarkula ("snotty young person")
 -ała, e.g. jąkać się ("to stutter") + ała → jąkała ("stutterer")
 -isko, e.g. wąs, m. ("mustache") + isko → wąsisko ("large mustache")
 -sko, e.g. baba, f. ("woman") + sko → babsko ("hag")
 -ysko, e.g. biedak m. ("pauper") + ysko → biedaczysko ("poor fellow")
 -or, e.g. but m. ("shoe") + or → bucior ("large or dirty shoe")

Russian
In Russian there is a variety of augmentatives formed with prefixes (including loans from Latin) and suffixes, including  -ище and -ин for example: дом (the house) домище (great house) домина (huge house). To provide an impression of excessive qualities the suffix -га can be used for example: ветер (the wind), ветрюга (strong wind).

Serbo-Croatian
In Serbo-Croatian there is a variety of augmentative nouns formed with suffixes:

 -ina, e.g. brdo, n. ("hill") + ina → brdina
 -čina, e.g. majmun, m. ("monkey") + čina → majmunčina
 -etina, e.g. kuća, f. ("house") + etina → kućetina
 -erina, e.g. kuća + erina → kućerina
 -urina, e.g. ptica, f. ("bird") + urina → ptičurina
 -ešina, e.g. glava, f. ("head") + ešina → glavešina
 -uština, e.g. bara, f. ("pond") + uština → baruština
 -ušina, e.g. pijetao, m. ("rooster") + ušina → pjetlušina

Augmentative nouns are either pejoratives, although distinct pejorative suffixes also exist. All augmentative nouns have female grammatical gender. Some nouns can have their augmentatives formed with different suffixes, for example, see 'kuća' above.

In Hrvatska gramatika, Barić et al. do not classify adjectives formed with suffixes which intensify an action or property as augmentatives. The augmentative prefixes for adjectives listed in Hrvatska gramatika are pre- ("excessively"; or excess of a favorable property), hiper- ("hyper-"), super- and ultra-. According to Hrvatska enciklopedija, augmentative verbs surpass their base verb with their intensity. However, by defining augmentative verbs as an action done excessively, Hrvatska gramatika only lists pre- ("over-") as an augmentative verb.

Semitic languages

Arabic

Form II of the Arabic verb often has an augmentative sense, which may indicate intensity (intensive) or repetition (frequentative).

Bantu languages
Bantu languages' noun class markers often double as augmentative and diminutive markers, and some have separate classes that are used only as a augmentative or a diminutive.

Chichewa

Chichewa noun class 7 prefix chi- doubles up as augmentative marker. For example, chi'''ndege which is a huge plane as opposed to ndege which is just a regular plane.

International auxiliary languages

Esperanto 
In Esperanto, the -- suffix is included before the final part-of-speech vowel. For example, domo (house) becomes domego (mansion). See Esperanto vocabulary.

Interlingua 
Interlingua does not have an augmentative suffix, but international prefixes such as super-, hyper-, mega- can be used as augmentatives. See also Interlingua grammar.

Notes

See also
 Diminutive
 Affect (linguistics)
 Comparison (grammar)

Linguistic morphology